Podocarpus latifolius (broad-leaved yellowwood or real yellowwood) is a large evergreen tree up to 35 m high and 3 m trunk diameter, in the conifer family Podocarpaceae; it is the type species of the genus Podocarpus.

The real yellowwood has been declared the national tree of South Africa and is protected there.

Appearance

The real yellowwood is a large evergreen tree that grows up to 30 meters in height. It grows relatively slowly but forms a wood of exceptional quality.

The leaves are strap-shaped, 25–40 mm long on mature trees or up to 100 mm long on young trees, and 6–12 mm broad, with a bluntly pointed tip. The species name "latifolius" is Latin for "broad-leaved". The bright-coloured foliage of new growth stands out against the dark leaves of mature foliage.

The cones of this dioecious tree are berry-like, with a single (rarely two) 7–11 mm seed apical on an 8–14 mm pink-purple aril; the aril is edible and sweet. The male (pollen) cones are 10–30 mm long.

Distribution
It is native to the moister southern and eastern areas of South Africa, from coastal areas of the Western Cape east to KwaZulu-Natal and north to eastern Limpopo. Pockets are naturally found further north in and around Zimbabwe.

It is commonly found in afro-temperate forests and often in mountainous areas. In harsh or exposed areas it tends to become stunted, small and dense.

Ecology
Podocarpus latifolius is the preferred phorophyte species of Solenangis conica, an epiphytic orchid.

Human usage

It is a slow-growing tree but exceptionally long-lived, and is increasingly grown as an ornamental feature in South African gardens. The unusual texture of the foliage is a reason for its growing popularity. The bright edible berries attract birds, which spread the seed.

The wood is hard, similar to yew wood, used for furniture, panelling, etc. Due to past over-exploitation, little is now cut.

Taxonomy

Relationship to Podocarpus milanjianus
Podocarpus latifolius is closely related to Podocarpus milanjianus. Whether they are a single or two separate species is not settled. Some authorities treat the South African populations as Podocarpus latifolius, and those elsewhere in Africa as Podocarpus milanjianus. Others treat them as a single species, Podocarpus latifolius.

A 2020 study sampled DNA from Podocarpus latifolius and Podocarpus milanjianus trees, gathered from 88 sites across Africa. They concluded that all populations sampled constituted a single species: "As South African samples (P. latifolius) did not form a clade separated from the other clades (P. milanjianus), we confirm that the two taxa can be considered as synonyms." The authors concluded that the species originated in East Africa. The western populations, in the highlands of Cameroon and Nigeria and in the Angolan highlands, diverged from the other populations around 300,000 years ago, and the species reached expanded to its current distribution pattern about 200,000 years ago.

References

External links
 South African National Symbols
 
 Images on iSpot
 Biodiversity Explorer

latifolius
Afromontane flora
Flora of Southern Africa
Flora of South Africa
Flora of the Cape Provinces
Trees of Africa
Least concern plants
Least concern biota of Africa
National symbols of South Africa
Protected trees of South Africa
Trees of South Africa
Trees of Mediterranean climate
Garden plants of Southern Africa
Ornamental trees
Plants used in bonsai